A Song of Ice and Fire, the series of fantasy novels by George R. R. Martin, has formed the basis of several works in different media.

Novellas

Dunk and Egg

Martin wrote three separate novellas set ninety years before the events of the novels. These novellas are known as the Tales of Dunk and Egg after the main protagonists, Ser Duncan the Tall and his squire "Egg", the later King Aegon V Targaryen. The stories have no direct connection to the plot of A Song of Ice and Fire, although both characters are mentioned in A Storm of Swords and A Feast For Crows, respectively.

The novellas were published in short story anthologies:
The Hedge Knight in Legends (1998)
The Sworn Sword in Legends II (2003) 
The Mystery Knight in Warriors (2010)

The unfinished series of novellas is to continue to be published in a series of collections entitled A Knight of the Seven Kingdoms. The first of these, comprising the first three novellas, was published – with illustrations by Gary Gianni – in October 2015, and in unillustrated translations earlier.

Film or TV adaptations of the novellas are being discussed, according to Martin in 2014. He wrote that because HBO owns the TV rights to the setting of Westeros (if not to the characters of the novellas), it would be preferable to have HBO adopt the novellas also.

The first and second novellas were, in addition, adapted as graphic novels:

Other novellas
Martin has written three additional novellas that are written as historical accounts of events that took place long before the events of the A Song of Ice and Fire novels or the Dunk and Egg novellas.

The Princess and the Queen, published in Dangerous Women (2013), details the civil war called the "Dance of the Dragons" between Aegon and Rhaenyra Targaryen about the succession to the Iron Throne.

A fifth novella, The Rogue Prince, or, a King's Brother, was published in the 2014 anthology Rogues. It is a prequel to The Princess and the Queen and concerns the life of Prince Daemon Targaryen, Rhaenyra's second husband.

Most recently, The Sons of the Dragon was published in the 2017 anthology The Book of Swords, and chronicles the lives of Aenys I and Maegor I Targaryen (later known as "Maegor the Cruel"), who were the second and third kings to sit the Iron Throne, respectively.

Television series

Game of Thrones (2011–19) 

In March 2010, HBO greenlit a television series based on A Song of Ice and Fire, written and executive produced by David Benioff and D. B. Weiss. Called Game of Thrones, it stars an ensemble cast including Sean Bean and Peter Dinklage.  The series premiered on 17 April 2011. A critical and commercial success, it ran for eight seasons, concluding in 2019.

The series has itself given rise to several derived works, including soundtrack albums and a wide range of merchandise.

House of the Dragon (2022–present) 

House of the Dragon is an American fantasy drama television series created by George R. R. Martin and Ryan J. Condal for HBO. It is a prequel to the television series Game of Thrones (2011–2019) and is based on Martin's 2018 novel Fire & Blood. The series is set two hundred years before the events of Game of Thrones and chronicles the beginning of the end of House Targaryen, the events leading up to the Targaryen civil war, known as the "Dance of the Dragons", and the war itself. House of the Dragon received a straight-to-series order in October 2019 with casting beginning in July 2020 and principal photography beginning in April 2021 in the United Kingdom. The first season of the series premiered in 2022 and consists of ten episodes.

Further spin-offs

In May 2017, after years of speculation about possible successor series, HBO commissioned Max Borenstein, Jane Goldman, Brian Helgeland, Carly Wray and Bryan Cogman to develop individual Game of Thrones successor series; all of the writers were to be working individually with George R. R. Martin, who also co-wrote two of the scripts. On June 8, 2018, HBO commissioned a pilot to a Game of Thrones prequel series from Goldman as showrunner and Martin as co-creator. S. J. Clarkson will direct and executive produce the pilot, which is scheduled to begin filming in mid-2019 in Northern Ireland and other locations.

Comic book series

The first issue of the comic book adaptation of the first novel, A Game of Thrones, by fantasy author Daniel Abraham and artist Tommy Patterson, was published by Dynamite Entertainment in September 2011. The series is set to run for 24 issues and is intended to follow the story of the novel closely.

The first six issues were published as a trade paperback in March 2012:

Parodies
Thomas Dunne Books announced in August 2011 that it had acquired the rights to Game of Groans, a parody of Game of Thrones in the vein of Bored of the Rings, by the pseudonymous "George R.R. Costanza". The book was eventually published on March 27, 2012 by St. Martin's Griffin and credited to "George R.R. Washington" and Alan Goldsher:

In 2012, The Bad Dog Theatre Company adapted the novels as a four-hour improv comedy show in Toronto, titled Throne of Games.

The fall 2012 ready-to-wear collection by the fashion brand Helmut Lang was inspired by Game of Thrones. In March 2012, Wiley-Blackwell published Game of Thrones and Philosophy: Logic Cuts Deeper than the Sword. This entry in Blackwell's Pop Culture and Philosophy series, edited by Henry Jacoby and William Irwin, aims to highlight and discuss philosophical issues raised by the show and its source material.

In 2013, Game of Thrones was notably parodied on the cover of Mad on April 30, as well as by a web series, School of Thrones, which set the story in a high school whose students vie for the title of prom king and queen. The "One World Symphony" company announced, in 2014, a musical production based on television series including Game of Thrones. In 2015, the Under the Gun Theater of Chicago premiered Swarm of Spoilers, a parody show recapitulating the first four seasons of the TV series.

In 2013, the animated comedy series South Park aired a three-part episode ("Black Friday", "A Song of Ass and Fire" and "Titties and Dragons") satirizing the U.S. custom of Black Friday in the form of a parody of Game of Thrones.

Two pornographic parodies of the series were also announced in 2013. One of these, This Ain't Game of Thrones XXX, was released in 2014, produced by Hustler Video and directed by Axel Braun. The movie incorporates many of the main characters such as Jaime Lannister (Richie Calhoun), Jon Snow (Ryan Driller), Cersei Lannister (Brandi Love), Sansa Stark (Marie McCray), Daenerys Targaryen (Spencer Scott), Tyrion Lannister (Evan Stone), and Brienne of Tarth (Amanda Tate).

In 2016 the parody recap series of Game of Thrones, called Gay of Thrones was nominated for a Primetime Emmy Award for Outstanding Short-Form Variety Series.

In 2015, the inaugural American edition of Red Nose Day featured the comedy sketch Coldplay's Game of Thrones: The Musical, a mockumentary regarding a failed musical theatre adaptation of the television show by the British band Coldplay, featuring many castmembers of Game of Thrones such as Peter Dinklage, Kit Harington, Nikolaj Coster-Waldau, Emilia Clarke, Alfie Allen and Iwan Rheon.

A parody titled Game of Thrones: The Musical, written by Basil Considine and developed by Really Spicy Opera, appeared at the Minnesota Fringe Festival in August 2016 and the 2017 Oahu and Maui Fringe Festivals and was rated a must-see by the St. Paul Pioneer Press.

Companion publications

Reader guides

The World of Ice & Fire

The World of Ice & Fire, an illustrated companion book for A Song of Ice and Fire written by Martin, Elio M. García Jr. and Linda Antonsson, was published by Bantam on October 28, 2014.

The Lands of Ice and Fire
A set of twelve maps of the world of A Song of Ice and Fire, drawn by Martin and Jonathan Roberts, was published in October 2012 as The Lands of Ice and Fire.

A Game of Thrones Guide
In November 2012, Random House published George R. R. Martin's A World of Ice and Fire – A Game of Thrones Guide, an iOS application that provides the biographies of 540 characters, descriptions of 380 places, and interactive maps. The app's "anti-spoiler functionality" hides information not yet revealed at the point up to which the user has read the novels.

Applications for mobile devices
Several other reader's companion apps for mobile electronic devices have been published, generally without the endorsement of Martin or his publisher. They include Game of Thrones Companion, similar in approach to the above-mentioned Guide, and Westeros Map for Game of Thrones, which contains maps of Essos and its cities. Other A Song of Ice and Fire- or Game of Thrones-themed apps include a trivia game, a study guide, and a weather app from HBO.

Compilation
The popularity of the Tyrion Lannister character led Martin and Bantam Books to publish The Wit & Wisdom of Tyrion Lannister, an illustrated collection of Tyrion quotes from the novels, in October 2013.

Commentary
Several publications discuss the themes addressed in the A Song of Ice and Fire series:
 Edited by James Lowder, this collection of essays by fantasy authors and science fiction experts, including R.A. Salvatore, Brent Hartinger, Ned Vizzini, Gary Westfahl and Daniel Abraham, addresses themes such as the nature of magic or the role of the prequels in Martin's work.
 This entry in Blackwell's Pop Culture and Philosophy series, edited by Henry Jacoby and William Irwin, aims to highlight and discuss philosophical issues raised by the novels and its TV adaptation.

Artbooks
The two volumes of The Art of Ice and Fire contain artworks inspired by the series from a variety of different artists and illustrators.

Recipes
Two blogs, Inn at the Crossroads and Cooking Ice and Fire, are dedicated to recreating the dishes described in the novels. Cooking Ice and Fire went defunct in early 2012.

There are also two cookbooks with recipes based on the novels: 
 Based on the blog Inn at the Crossroads.

Games

Board games
There are multiple board games set in the world of A Song of Ice and Fire.

In 2003, Fantasy Flight Games released the strategy board game A Game of Thrones, created by Christian T. Petersen. The Origins Award-winning game allows the players to take on the roles of several of the Great Houses vying for control of the Seven Kingdoms, including House Stark, House Lannister, House Baratheon, House Greyjoy, House Tyrell, and as of the expansion A Clash of Kings, House Martell. Players maneuver armies to secure support in the various regions that comprise the Seven Kingdoms, with the goal of capturing enough support to claim the Iron Throne. Two expansions for the game, A Clash of Kings and A Storm of Swords have been released.  In 2011, a second edition has been released appropriately titled "A Game of Thrones: The Board Game (Second Edition)".  This version has since released three expansions, A Feast for Crows, A Dance with Dragons, and Mother of Dragons".

Battles of Westeros, was released by Fantasy Flight Games in 2010. It is based on the system created by Richard Borg and used in such games as Memoir 44 or Commands & Colors: Ancients. The two player-game's base set includes two factions: House Stark and House Lannister. Later expansions cover additional factions and scenarios.

In 2015, USAopoly released Game of Thrones Risk. It is a variant of the board game Risk with changes to incorporate the theme such as Maestar cards, Character cards and new maps of Westeros and Essos.

In 2018, CMON Limited, Dark Swords Miniatures, Inc., and Edge Entertainment released "A Song of Ice & Fire: Tabletop Miniatures Game".  The starter set for the game featured two factions:  House Stark and House Lannister.  Later expansions cover additional factions and scenarios.

Card game

A living card game (LCG) has been produced by Fantasy Flight Games.  It was a continuation of an earlier collectible card game (CCG). A number of base sets have been released for the game, each with a number of expansions. The game's primary designer is Eric Lang and the lead developer is Nate French. The A Game of Thrones: Westeros Edition won the Origins Award for Best Trading Card Game of 2002. The Game of Thrones: Ice and Fire Edition won the Origins Award for Best Card Game Expansion or Supplement of 2003.

Role-playing games

A role-playing game titled A Game of Thrones was produced by Guardians of Order. The game is designed to be usable with two RPG systems: the d20 System and the Tri-Stat dX system. Two editions were made: a serial-numbered edition limited to 2500 copies, ; and a standard edition, . The limited edition is faux-leather bound with silver gilt pages and includes rules for both systems, and includes an interview with Martin. The standard edition contains only the d20 system rules. The book was created by Guardians of Order and released by Sword & Sorcery, a subsidiary of White Wolf Games.

A later role-playing game titled A Song of Ice and Fire Roleplaying was published by Green Ronin Publishing in 2009.

Video games

The success of the HBO TV series motivated the development of several video games. While the 2007 fan-made MUSH and the 2011 strategy game were based on the novels only, the later games also incorporate elements such as designs or music from the TV series, based on a license from HBO.

Blood of Dragons (2007):
Blood of Dragons is an online, text-based roleplaying MUSH. It opened in 2007 and is set about 140 years prior to the events in the novels, during the reign of Daeron I and his conquest of Dorne. The game is maintained by the administrators of the fan site Westeros.org, who are collaborating with Martin on The World of Ice and Fire.

A Game of Thrones: Genesis (2011):
In 2011, Cyanide developed a real-time strategy video game, A Game of Thrones: Genesis, which allows players to partake in the conquest of Westeros beginning generations before the time in which the novels are set.

Game of Thrones: The Role-Playing Game (2012):
A second video game based on the series, called simply Game of Thrones, was developed by Cyanide in May 2012. It is a role-playing game set in the town of Riverspring, during the time of the events of the novel A Game of Thrones, but not principally involving the novels' main characters.

Game of Thrones Ascent (2013):
Game of Thrones Ascent, a freemium social network game, was made available by Disruptor Beam in 2013 on Facebook and Kongregate. It was made in collaboration with HBO and George R.R. Martin. The game combines storytelling and strategy elements, allowing players to lead the life of a nobleman during the time of upheaval portrayed in the novels and the TV series.

Game of Thrones: A Telltale Games Series (2014):
Starting in 2014, Telltale Games produced a six-episode adventure game titled Game of Thrones.

Game of Thrones: Seven Kingdoms (discontinued):
In February 2012, Bigpoint announced the development of a browser-based massively multiplayer online role-playing game (MMORPG) Game of Thrones: Seven Kingdoms. The game was being developed by Artplant, who also created Battlestar Galactica Online. After Bigpoint was acquired by Yoozoo Games in 2016, this license was instead used to produce Game of Thrones: Winter Is Coming.

Game of Thrones: Conquest (2017):
Game of Thrones: Conquest, a freemium multiplayer strategy mobile game, was made available by Warner Bros. Games in 2018 on iOS and Android platforms.  The game was developed by Turbine.

Game of Thrones: Winter Is Coming (2019):
Game of Thrones: Winter Is Coming is a 2019 real-time strategy browser game set in a side-branch timeline where, after Eddard Stark died, all seven Westeros kingdoms seceded.

Modifications of commercial games
There are several fan-made modifications ("mods") to commercial video games that allow playing in the world of A Song of Ice and Fire. These include a total conversion  for the strategy game Crusader Kings II as well as the mods "War of the Usurper" for its predecessor Crusader Kings, "Westeros: Total War The Age of Petty Kings", placed before Aegon's Conquest, for Medieval II: Total War and "A Clash Of Kings" for Mount & Blade: Warband.

Merchandise

Miniatures
Testor Corporation announced that in late 2006 it would begin releasing model figures based on the series, to be followed by a tactical wargame. Only one product shipped, a Ruby Ford diorama. In April 2007, Martin announced that the licensing agreement with Testor had expired, and Testor's A Song of Ice and Fire product lines had been canceled. In December 2006, Haute Productions signed a deal to release a range of resin mini-busts featuring characters from A Song of Ice and Fire under the name Valyrian Resin. The company plans to expand the line to include resin statues and pewter chess sets.
In 2007, Dark Sword Miniatures announced a line of pewter miniatures based on the world of George R. R. Martin's A Song of Ice and Fire and sculpted by Tom Meier.
In 2018, Dark Sword Miniatures in collaboration with CMON Limited released a line of pewter miniatures  for use in the A Song of Ice & Fire: Tabletop Miniatures Game.

Display weapons
On 20 March 2007, George R. R. Martin announced on his blog that he had "signed a deal with Jalic, Inc. of East Lansing, Michigan, granting them a license to manufacture and sell full-sized high-quality replicas of the arms and armor from A Song of Ice and Fire", under the name Valyrian Steel, starting with the bastard sword Longclaw wielded by Jon Snow (two versions). Since then Valyrian has produced replicas of the Stark family greatsword Ice (in two versions), Arya Starks Needle, and Robert Baratheons mighty warhammer. Dragonglass arrowheads and a single dagger have also been produced in a collectible First Men wooden box. Valyrian also announced that it will be producing HBO's show versions of Game of Thrones weapons, which differ in appearance from those described in the Ice and Fire novel series.

Music

Greek black metal band Nocternity'''s guitarist's pseudonym is Khal Drogo and they recorded a song on 2003's Onyx CD called "Valyrian Steel (Blood Of The Dragon)" with lyrics directly referencing Daenerys' storyline and events.

Swedish power metal band HammerFall released an album in 2005 titled Chapter V: Unbent, Unbowed, Unbroken, the family motto of House Martell. Tracks on the album such as "Take the Black", "Fury of the Wild", and "Hammer of Justice" directly reference events and characters. The following album Threshold also features a song inspired by A Song of Ice and Fire, titled "Dark Wings, Dark Words". Their 2014 album (r)Evolution also features two songs inspired by the series, titled "Winter Is Coming", the family motto of House Stark, and "Wildfire", a highly flammable liquid in the ASoIaF world, which burns with a green fire.

The German symphonic metal band Blind Guardian have written two songs dedicated to the world of George R. R. Martin's A Song of Ice and Fire. The songs are called "War of the Thrones" and "A Voice in the Dark" and are part of their 2010 At the Edge of Time album.Review of the album 

British alternative rock band Dark Stares based their name on Ser Gerold Dayne, known as Darkstar. Their song "Blackfyre" from EP Octopon is a homage to House Blackfyre and the Blackfyre Rebellion.

In 2012, the Canadian band Irish Moutarde adapted the song The Bear and the Maiden Fair'', sung at various times in the novels, as a celtic punk rock song.

The metal band, The Sword, has a song on the album Gods of the Earth called "To Take the Black" referencing the Night's Watch.

American power metal band Last Alliance recorded an album called the Westeros Trilogy in 2013.

References